Stephen Geoffrey Miller (born November 22, 1964), known professionally as Stephen Geoffreys, is an American actor.  Rising to prominence in teen films in the 1980s, Geoffreys is perhaps best known for his role as high school misfit-turned vampire, "Evil Ed" in the 1985 horror film Fright Night, in addition to both starring and supporting performances in Heaven Help Us (1985), Fraternity Vacation (1985), At Close Range (1986), and 976-EVIL (1988).

Life and career
Born Stephen Geoffrey Miller in Cincinnati, Ohio, Geoffreys first began acting on the stage. In 1984, he was nominated for Broadway's Tony Award for "Best Performance by a Featured Actor in a Musical" for his performance in a play based on The Human Comedy. For this role, he won the Theatre World Award in 1984.

Geoffreys appeared in several horror and teen films in the 1980s, most notably Heaven Help Us (1985) as well as Fraternity Vacation and 976-EVIL with the director/actor Robert Englund from A Nightmare on Elm Street in 1989. He also played a supporting part in the critically acclaimed drama At Close Range in 1986.  He is best known for playing the teenage misfit-turned vampire "Evil" Ed in the 1985 vampire horror film Fright Night, also starring Roddy McDowall, William Ragsdale, and Chris Sarandon. Geoffreys was asked to reprise his role in Fright Night Part 2 but turned it down to play the lead role in 976-EVIL.

During the 1990s, Geoffreys appeared for several years in gay pornographic movies, using the alias Sam Ritter.

Geoffreys returned to horror in a supporting role as "Mr. Putski" in the independent film Sick Girl, released in October 2007, after an almost 9-year absence from mainstream film. He went on to play a lead role in the horror film Do Not Disturb. He later appeared in the horror film Emerging Past, which also featured actor Brooke McCarter  of The Lost Boys fame. As part of the Mad Monster Party on 28 March 2015, Geoffreys wore his Evil Ed costume.

Filmography
1985: Heaven Help Us as Williams
1985: Fraternity Vacation as Wendell Tvedt
1985: Fright Night as Evil Ed
1985: The Twilight Zone (TV Series) as Will (segment "The Elevator")
1986: At Close Range as Aggie
1987: Amazing Stories  
1988: The Chair as Roach
1988: 976-EVIL as Hoax Arthur Wilmoth
1990: Moon 44 as Cookie
1991: Wild Blade as Colt
1998: Famous Again
2007: Sick Girl as Mr. Putski
2010: New Terminal Hotel as Don Malek
2010: Mr. Hush as Stark
2011: The Diary of Randy Rose as Brother (voice)
2011: Emerging Past as Cameron
2011: Bite Marks as Walsh
2013: Do Not Disturb
2014: Lazarus as Steven Wells
2017: Emerging Past (director's cut)
2017: Check Point as Grant
2017: The Emerging Past Director's Cut as Cameron

Prizes and nominations

Theater

Tony Award
1984 The Human Comedy - nominated

Theatre World Award
1984 The Human Comedy - winner

References

External links
 (archived copy)

Stephen Geoffeys awards

1964 births
American male television actors
American male musical theatre actors
Living people
Male actors from Cincinnati
American gay actors
Pornographic film actors from Ohio
American male film actors
American actors in gay pornographic films